Ametadoria is a genus of flies in the family Tachinidae.

Species
A. abdominalis (Townsend, 1934) (Synonym: Abolodoria abdominalis Townsend, 1934)
A. austrina (Coquillett, 1902) (Synonym: Sturmia austrina Coquillett, 1902)
A. fuliginipennis (Wulp, 1890) (Synonym: Didyma fuliginipennis Wulp, 1890)
A. harrisinae (Coquillett, 1897) (Synonyms: Sturmia harrisinae Coquillett, 1897, Erycia tuxedo Curran, 1930, Masicera unispinosa Reinhard, 1930)
A. humilis (Wulp, 1890) (Synonym: Exorista humilis Wulp, 1890)
A. karolramosae Fleming & Wood, 2015
A. leticiamartinezae Fleming & Wood, 2015
A. mauriciogurdiani Fleming & Wood, 2015
A. misella (Wulp, 1890) (Synonym: Anisia misella Wulp, 1890)
A. unispinosa Townsend, 1927 (Synonyms: Adidyma adversa Townsend, 1935, Ametadoria adversa (Townsend, 1935))

References

Diptera of North America
Diptera of South America
Exoristinae
Tachinidae genera
Taxa named by Charles Henry Tyler Townsend